Euhalidaya is a genus of flies in the family Tachinidae.

Species
Euhallidaya basalis (Wulp, 1890)
Euhallidaya chosica (Townsend, 1915)
Euhallidaya genalis (Coquillett, 1897)
Euhallidaya orbitalis (Townsend, 1927)
Euhallidaya valparadisi (Cortés, 1968).

References

Diptera of South America
Diptera of North America
Exoristinae
Tachinidae genera